Below are the results for the 2011 World Series of Poker Europe.

Key

Results

Event 1: €2,680 Six Handed No Limit Hold'em
3-Day Event: October 7, 2011 to October 9, 2011 
Number of buy-ins: 360
Total Prize Pool: €864,000
Number of Payouts: 36
Winning Hand:

Event 2: €1,090 No Limit Hold'em
5-Day Event: October 8, 2011 to October 12, 2011 
Number of buy-ins: 771
Total Prize Pool: €740,160
Number of Payouts: 81
Winning Hand:

Event 3: €5,300 Pot Limit Omaha
3-Day Event: October 10, 2011 to October 12, 2011 
Number of buy-ins: 180
Total Prize Pool: €882,000
Number of Payouts: 18
Winning Hand:

Event 4: €3,200 No Limit Hold'em SHOOTOUT
3-Day Event: October 11, 2011 to October 13, 2011 
Number of buy-ins: 258
Total Prize Pool: €743,040
Number of Payouts: 30
Winning Hand:

Event 5: €10,400 No Limit Hold'em (Split Format)
4-Day Event: October 12, 2011 to October 15, 2011 
Number of buy-ins: 125
Total Prize Pool: €1,200,000
Number of Payouts: 16
Winning Hand:

Event 6: €1,620 Six-Handed Pot Limit Omaha
3-Day Event: October 13, 2011 to October 15, 2011 
Number of buy-ins: 339
Total Prize Pool: €498,330
Number of Payouts: 36
Winning Hand:

Event 7: €10,400 WSOPE Main Event Championship
5-Day Event: October 15, 2011 to October 19, 2011 
Number of buy-ins: 593
Total Prize Pool: €5,692,800
Number of Payouts: 64
Winning Hand:

Notes

World Series of Poker Europe
World Series of Poker Europe Results, 2011